Bob "Butts" Butler (April 4, 1891 – December 17, 1959) was an American football player who played at the University of Wisconsin–Madison. In 1915, Butler was recruited by Jack Cusack, manager of the Canton Bulldogs, to bolster his roster against the rival Massillon Tigers. He was elected to the College Football Hall of Fame in 1972.

References
 Pioneer in Pro Football by Jack Cusack
 Pigskin: The Early Years of Pro Football

1891 births
1959 deaths
Canton Bulldogs (Ohio League) players
Wisconsin Badgers football players
All-American college football players
American football tackles
College Football Hall of Fame inductees
People from Alpena, Michigan